Fimreite is a small village in the municipality of Sogndal in Vestland county, Norway. The village sits on the south side of the mouth of the Sogndalsfjorden, where it empties into the main Sognefjorden. The village of Nornes lies across the Sogndalsfjorden from Fimreite.

Fimreite was the site of the Battle of Fimreite in 1184, a naval battle during the civil war era in Norway.

One set of the Sognefjord Spans crosses the Sognefjorden just west of Fimreite.

Commemoration
In 1984, a memorial stone was unveiled by King Olav V of Norway to commemorate the 800-year anniversary of the Battle of Fimreite. The obelisk was erected in the nearby village of Nornes. At that time, the historic play Slaget ved Fimreite and the composition Klokkesong (1984) by composer Arne Nordheim were performed .

References

Villages in Vestland
Sogndal